Sixteen nations are competing at the 2013 World Baseball Classic qualification.

Key

Qualifier 1

Manager  Jim Stoeckel
Coaches Eric Gagné

Manager  Brad Ausmus
Coaches Mark Loretta

Manager  Rick Magnante
Coaches Brian McAm

Manager  Mauro Mazzotti
Coaches Manny Crespo

Qualifier 2

Manager  Ernie Whitt
Coaches Greg Hamilton

Manager  Andy Berglund
Coaches Mike Griffin

Manager  Greg Frady
Coaches Justin Pope

Manager  Sam Dempster
Coaches Brian Essery

Qualifier 3

Manager  Barry Larkin
Coaches Tiago Caldeira

Manager   Eduardo Pérez
Coaches Luis Urueta

Rosters